HGFC can refer to:

 Hayes Gate F.C.
 Holmer Green F.C.